Mendonça is a Portuguese and Galician surname of Basque origin. It sometimes appears as the anglicized forms Mendonca or Mendonsa. The Spanish variant is Mendoza. The name has been often linked with royalty. The name may refer to:

General

Ana de Mendonça (1460–1542), Portuguese mistress of King John II of Portugal
Carla Mendonça (born 1961), English actress
Cristóvão de Mendonça (1475–1532), Portuguese explorer
Duda Mendonça (born 1944), Brazilian public relations specialist
Eneida A. Mendonça, Brazilian-born physician-scientist / biomedical informatician
Francisco de Ascensão Mendonça (1889–1982), Portuguese botanist
Gaelyn Mendonca, Indian actress
Gilberto Mendonça Teles (born 1931), Brazilian writer
Henrique Lopes de Mendonça (1856–1939), Portuguese poet, playwright and naval officer
, Brazilian Senator and businessman
Leroy A. Mendonca (1932–1951), United States Army posthumous recipient of the Medal of Honor for action in Korea
Nuno José Severo de Mendonça Rolim de Moura Barreto (1804–1875), Portuguese prime minister

Musicians

Eduardo Mendonça (born 1960), Brazilian musician
Jason Mendonça, British musician
Kathy Mendonca, American musician
Marília Mendonça (1995–2021), Brazilian singer-songwriter
Newton Mendonça (1927–1960), Brazilian musician
Paulo Mendonça, Swedish musician
Stella Mendonça (born 1970), Mozambican opera singer

Sports

António Mendonça (born 1982), Angolan footballer
Clive Mendonca (born 1968), British footballer
Ivor Mendonca (1934–2014), West Indian cricketer
Jorge Mendonça (1954–2006), Brazilian footballer
Jorge Alberto Mendonça (born 1938), Portuguese/Angolan footballer
Marcelo Mendonça de Mattos (born 1984), Brazilian footballer
Romero Mendonça Sobrinho (born 1975), Brazilian footballer
Sandro da Silva Mendonça (born 1983), Brazilian footballer
Tommy Mendonca (born 1988), American baseball player

See also
Mendoza, Spanish variant
Mendonsa, an Indian variant

Portuguese-language surnames